María Belén Potassa (born 12 December 1988), known as Belén Potassa, is an Argentine footballer who plays as a forward. She has been a member of the Argentina women's national team.

She previously played for the women's teams of Rosario Central, San Lorenzo, Santiago Morning (in Chile) and Boca Juniors before joining UAI Urquiza in July 2014.

International career
Potassa represented Argentina at the 2006 South American U-20 Women's Championship, 2006 FIFA U-20 Women's World Cup and the 2008 FIFA U-20 Women's World Cup. At senior level, she played the 2006 South American Women's Football Championship, three Pan American Games editions (2007, 2011 and 2015), the 2007 FIFA Women's World Cup, the 2008 Summer Olympics and the 2018 Copa América Femenina.

International goals
Scores and results list Argentina's goal tally first

References
Notes

Citations

External links
 

1988 births
Living people
Argentine women's footballers
Sportspeople from Santa Fe Province
Women's association football forwards
Argentina women's international footballers
2007 FIFA Women's World Cup players
2019 FIFA Women's World Cup players
Olympic footballers of Argentina
Footballers at the 2008 Summer Olympics
Pan American Games competitors for Argentina
Footballers at the 2007 Pan American Games
Footballers at the 2011 Pan American Games
Footballers at the 2015 Pan American Games
Rosario Central (women) players
San Lorenzo de Almagro (women) players
Santiago Morning footballers
Boca Juniors (women) footballers
UAI Urquiza (women) players
Fundación Albacete players
Segunda Federación (women) players
Argentine expatriate women's footballers
Argentine expatriate sportspeople in Chile
Expatriate women's footballers in Chile
Argentine expatriate sportspeople in Spain
Expatriate women's footballers in Spain